Leung Cheuk Cheung (born 22 February 1965 in Hong Kong) is a former Hong Kong professional footballer who played as a goalkeeper. He is currently a football coach.

Honours
Happy Valley
Hong Kong First Division League: 2000–01, 2002–03, 2005–06
Hong Kong Senior Shield: 2003–04
Hong Kong League Cup: 2005–06, 2006–07
Hong Kong FA Cup: 2003–04
Cité de Louvre Cup: 2005–06

References

External links
Leung Cheuk Cheung at HKFA
Profile at hvaafc.com 

1965 births
Living people
Hong Kong footballers
Hong Kong First Division League players
Hong Kong international footballers
Association football goalkeepers
South China AA players
Happy Valley AA players
TSW Pegasus FC players